Stigmella kazakhstanica is a moth of the family Nepticulidae. It is found in Astrakhan, Kazakhstan and Turkmenistan.

The larvae feed on Ulmus species, including Ulmus carpinifolia. They mine the leaves of their host plant. The mine has the form of a contorted gallery. In the beginning, completely filled with brownish frass. The mine gradually widens. Larvae can be found in June and August.

References

External links
Fauna Europaea
Nepticulidae from the Volga and Ural region

Nepticulidae
Moths described in 1991
Moths of Asia